The ArenaCup was the af2's championship game.  For the league's first five years, it was held at the arena of the higher seeded team. However, the 2005 ArenaCup was the first to be played at a neutral site in Bossier City, Louisiana.  The 2006 ArenaCup was played in Coliseo de Puerto Rico in San Juan. On August 25, 2007, ArenaCup 8 returned to Bossier City, LA.  ArenaCup 9 was played at the arena of the higher seeded team, the Spokane Shock. ArenaCup 10 was held at the Orleans Arena in Paradise, Nevada.

For the 2000 and 2001 ArenaCups, the game was televised nationally by TNN (now Paramount Network), who carried AFL games at the time. However, when the AFL announced their televised games would be shown on NBC rather than TNN, the ArenaCup telecast was lost. The 2002 ArenaCup was televised by the Vision Network, and the 2003 game was televised by KWHB, a local station in Tulsa, Oklahoma. After having no television coverage in 2004, the game was telecast nationally by Fox Sports Net in 2005 and Comcast Sports Net in 2006.

The ArenaCup, along with all assets of af2, were purchased by Arena Football 1 (now the current incarnation of the Arena Football League) in December 2009. Because that league uses the ArenaBowl as its championship, the ArenaCup was retired.

Results

Most ArenaCup Championships won

References

 
Recurring sporting events established in 2000
Indoor American football competitions
2000 establishments in the United States